The Area EP is the follow-up release by The Futureheads after their self-titled debut album.
The stand-alone EP was recorded in September 2005 in London and Newcastle upon Tyne.
These tracks were re-released on the US version of News and Tributes.The title track of the EP was first premiered on the Shockwave NME Awards Tour 2005 during The Futureheads set.

Track listing
All songs written by The Futureheads.

CD1

 "Area" – 2:45
 "Decent Days and Nights" (Shy Child remix) – 4:38

CD2

 "Area" – 2:45
 "Help Us Out" – 2:21
 "We Cannot Lose" – 2:32
 "Area: Video" – 2:45

7" Vinyl (Contains Free Poster)
 "Area" – 2:45
 "Help Us Out" – 2:21
 "We Cannot Lose" – 2:32

References

External links 
Official site
Review Summary At Metacritic
Sample of the video clip for 'Area'

The Futureheads EPs
2005 EPs
679 Artists EPs